Parodius! The European SNES version is also known as Parodius: Non-Sense Fantasy. The gameplay is stylistically very similar to the Gradius series, but the graphics and music are intentionally absurd.

As a result of its localised title, From Myth to Laughter is often mistaken as the original game of the series. The lesser known original game, Parodius: The Octopus Saves the Earth, was released for the MSX computer in Japan.

Story

Gameplay

As stated above, gameplay is very similar to the Gradius series with a few differences. Parodius retains the selectability of different weapons configurations but implements it via four different characters: Vic Viper (from Gradius), Octopus, TwinBee, and Pentarou.  The second main difference is the addition of bell power-ups, from the TwinBee series.  These bells act as one-time power-ups, allowing the player to destroy every enemy on screen, fire huge beams of energy, etc. Enemies and environments from the Gradius games and TwinBee are mixed in along with a host of anime-style opponents, including scantily-clad women. All of the Gradius elements are integrated in a light-hearted fashion. The Big Core, a regular boss within the Gradius series, is given a neon look and is called "Viva Core". Moreover, there is a moai (Easter Island head statues) level, but all of the statues are given a much more animated look. The boss of that level, Yoshiko, fires other moai at the player by spitting them out of her mouth. The final boss, in typical Gradius fashion, is an unarmed enemy that once defeated results in a destruction/escape sequence.

Characters and weapons
Vic Viper – Traditional Gradius configuration
The missile will fall to the ground, and then move along until it encounters an enemy. The Double mode will fire two blasts, one forward, and one at an incline forty-five degrees above. The Laser mode is a thin blue laser, identical to the one in Gradius.

Octopus – Salamander configuration
This configuration is identical to the weapons presented in the Salamander arcade game. The missile is '2-way' that yields two bomb-like explosives that fall both up and down. The Double is the tail gun present in the second configuration, and the laser is the ripple laser, which fires expanding concentric circles at the front of the craft/person.

TwinBee (Colored as Winbee) – TwinBee configuration
This set is the weapons from the vertically scrolling TwinBee, applied to horizontal gameplay.  The missile is now the rocket punch, which has a larger impact area than the standard missile. The double is the same tail gun from the Octopus/Salamander configuration. The laser is a 3-way gun which fires shots the same size as the Double and standard weapons.
 Due to the color bug, it could be considered that Winbee, rather than TwinBee, has the most appearances in video games, however this TwinBee doesn't have the same cockpit windshield design as either TwinBee, Winbee or Gwinbee.

Pentarou – Gradius II: Gofer's Ambition configuration
This set is almost identical to one of the power meter sets in Gradius II: Gofer's Ambition. The missile is the photon torpedo (spelled in-game as "Poton") that fires one missile that travels along the bottom ground and penetrates multiple enemies. The Double mode will fire two blasts, one forward, and one at an incline forty-five degrees above. The laser mode is different from the one in Gradius II; instead of a ripple laser analog, it fires bullets that create small explosions upon impact.

Stages
Below is a listing of the stages from the original version:
The first stage is a pirate-themed, earth-like planet. The music is a remix of "Thunder & Lightning Polka" by Johann Strauss II. The music during Cat Battleship is a remix of the final part of "Symphony No. 9" by Ludwig van Beethoven, and the music during the boss fight against Captain Penguinovski the 3rd is a remix of "Flight of the Bumblebee by Nikolai Rimsky-Korsakov.
The second stage is a Las-Vegas-themed and circus-themed planet. The music is a remix of "Piano Concerto No. 1" and "Dance of the Reed Pipes" by Pyotr Ilyich Tchaikovsky.  The music during Chichibinta Rika is a remix of "The Final Enemy" from Gradius II, and the music during the boss fight against Eagle Eagle Sabnosuke is a remix of the final boss theme from Gradius II.
The third stage is a recreation of a floating candy fortress in space. The music is a remix of "Trepak" by Pyotr Ilyich Tchaikovsky, followed by "William Tell Overture" by Gioachino Rossini. During boss fight against Hot Lips, the music is a remix of "Can-can" by Offenbach.
The fourth stage is a Japanese-themed volcanic planet. The music is a remix of "Sabre Dance" by Aram Khacaturian (Russian folk song "Kalinka" by Ivan Larionov and "Hungarian Dances" by Johannes Brahms in PSP version). The music during the boss battle against Pig Tide is a remix of Japanese folk song "Yagibushi".
The fifth stage is a Moai battleship. The music is a remix of "L'Arlésienne Suite No. 2, Farandole" by Georges Bizet, followed by "The Old Stone Age" from Gradius series. The boss fight against Yoshiko uses "Flight of the Bumblebee" as its music.
The sixth stage is a pinball planet. The music is a remix of "Gunkan March" by Tōkichi Setoguchi. During the boss against Viva Core, a remix of "Aircraft Carrier" from the Gradius series plays.
The seventh stage is a planet that full of pink clouds, beautiful girls, and bubbles. The music is a remix of "Waltz of the Flowers" by Pyotr Ilyich Tchaikovsky. The music for the boss, Honey Mikayo, is a remix of "Flight of the Bumblebee".
The eighth stage is a strange, alien, ice cavern planet. The music is a remix of "Violin Concerto, Op. 64" by Felix Mendelssohn and "Under the Double Eagle" by Josef Franz Wagner. The boss is Pooyan (a giant pufferfish), and the music is a remix of "Flight of the Bumblebee".
The ninth stage is a graveyard planet full of ghosts from Japanese and Egyptian folklore, and contains a lava lake. The music is a remix of "In the Hall of the Mountain King" by Edvard Grieg and "Swan Lake". The boss fight against Iron Maiden MK III uses the final part of Beethoven's "Symphony No. 9", and the boss fight against Yoshiwara Dayuu with ash clouds uses a remix of "William Tell's Storm" by Gioachino Rossini.
The tenth and final stage is Zeo's fortress in the unknown planet. The music is the final stage theme from Gradius II, and the final boss theme is "Aircraft Carrier" from Gradius II.

Bosses
Below is a list of the bosses from the original version:
Cat Battleship
Captain Penguinovski the 3rd
Chichibinta Rika
Eagle Eagle Sabnosuke
Hot Lips
Pig Tide
Yoshiko
Viva Core
Honey Mikayo
Pooyan
Iron Maiden MK III
Yoshiwara Dayuu
Showering Beauty
Golgotha Takobee

The platform-exclusive bosses include Penguin Conducter, Madam of Yotsuya Q, Viking Moai, Woon Botton, Crystal Golem, Marvelous Green Mantle, Great Gourmet King Manjiri Kun, Super DX Emperor Penguin, Tako Hyuuma, Penguin Bomb.

The NES version replaces Chichibinta Rika with Miss Mishitarina, and Honey Mikayo does not appear within the game at all despite appearing on the European NES cover.

Hot Lips, Pig Tide, Honey Mikayo, Iron Maiden MK III and Yoshiwara Dayuu do not appear in the Mobile version.

Music

The soundtrack was produced by Konami Kukeiha Club and released by King Records on July 21, 1990 in Japan. It was also reprinted on September 23, 1998.
A CD Arrangement was released on June 21, 1991.
A Ending Music for Parodius for Game Boy Version was a part of Konami Ending Collection, which was released for CD Soundtrack on October 21, 1991.
In addition, disc 4 of Konami Music Masterpiece Collection, which was released on October 1, 2004, is devoted to this game.
The Songs of Parodius Da! were: Northern Country '90 and Night of the Living Dead was contain CD Music what it is part of LEGEND COMPILATION SERIES - Classic in Game Music on September 21, 2005 in Japan.

Ports
Parodius has been ported to a number of platforms, most notably the Super Famicom (released on the SNES in Europe) and the PC Engine. The game was also ported to the Family Computer (released on the NES in Europe) with several stages omitted but with a new amusement park stage as well as several hidden bonus stages. Most recently the game, along with several other Gradius titles, has been ported to Java-based cell phones in Japan.

The Game Boy version (which was also released in Europe) shows the ages of the playable characters, and only has 8 stages, which include stages 1–6, and 10 from the arcade game. Stage 3 was moved to Stage 4. The Game Boy version of stage 3 also has a hidden stage. This version was also re-released in color as part of the Konami GB Collection Vol. 2.

There was also a Japan-exclusive port for the X68000.

The PC Engine version does not have the arcade Stages 5 and 8, but features a stage titled SPECIAL and a new introduction that features several strange-looking Japanese characters. This is in contrast to the arcade intro, which chronicles the Gradius legacy up until the time of release.

The SFC/SNES version added the bath house and "Omake" stages over the arcade version. In the "Omake" stage, the player immediately continues after dying, instead of at a checkpoint. The PAL version of the SNES port was titled Parodius: Non-Sense Fantasy and "Omake" was retitled "Lollipop".

The Mobile phone version titled  was released in 2003 in Japan, and does not have the arcade Stages 3, 4, 7, 8 and 9.

Parodius was also ported along with its sequel Fantastic Parodius - Pursue the Glory of the Past on the compilation also simply titled Gokujou Parodius Da! Deluxe Pack in Japan and Parodius in Europe for PlayStation in 1994 and Sega Saturn in 1995 and in Parodius Portable for PlayStation Portable in 2007.

Reception 
In Japan, Game Machine listed Parodius! From Myth to Laughter on their June 1, 1990 issue as being the seventh most-successful table arcade unit of the month. It went on to be one of the top five highest-grossing arcade games of 1990 in Japan, where it also won the 1990 Gamest Awards for Best Production and Best Shooting Game. In 1996, Super Play ranked the game 93rd on their Top 100 SNES Games of All Time.  The described the game as "Gradius on hallucinogens."

Mean Machines magazine gave the Super NES version a positive review, giving it a 93% score. Computer and Video Games gave the SNES version an 88% score, and the PlayStation version an 85% score.

Popular culture 
 Captain Penguinovsky the 3rd, Hot Lips and Chichibinta Rika from Parodius Da!  appear in the puzzle game Pixel Puzzle Collection to commemorate the 30th anniversary of the Parodius series.
 Parodius Da! is one of the video games featured in the manga titled Rock'n Game Boy, by Shigeto Ikehara and published by Comic BomBom October 1989 to December 1991.
 In the Fushigi Shoujo Nile na Thutmose episode 20 "The Phantom of Game Center" (1991), Nile Tuthmose is playing Parodius Da!.
 In Famitsu Comic '92 Barcelona Olympic, Tako from Parodius makes a brief cameo as a contestant.
 Chichibin Tarika from Parodius Da! makes a cameo appearance in the manga High Score Girl (2010).

Notes

References

External links
Official Konami Mobile Minisite 

1990 video games
Arcade video games
Game Boy games
Mobile games
Nintendo Entertainment System games
Parodius
Horizontally scrolling shooters
X68000 games
Sega Saturn games
Super Nintendo Entertainment System games
PlayStation (console) games
TurboGrafx-16 games
Video games developed in Japan
Video games set in outer space